John Gowan may refer to:

 John Curtis Gowan (1912–1986), psychologist
 John Hunter Gowan II, Irish loyalist and leader of a yeomanry corps